Abu Muslim Al-Khawlani (died 684) was a well-known tabi'i (plural: taba'een) and a prominent religious figure in Damascus, Syria. He was one of the 'Eight Ascetics,' who also included Amir ibn Abd al-Qays, Uways al-Qarani, Al-Rabi ibn Khuthaym, al-Aswad ibn Yazid, Masruq ibn al-Ajda', Sufyan al-Thawri ibn Said and Hasan al-Basri.

Stories of his life
It is recorded by Sheikh 'Aa'id Abdullah al-Qarni that Al Aswad al `Ansi, a man in Yemen who claimed prophethood, asked Abu Muslim to believe in him and testify that he is a messenger. Abu Muslim told him:  "I can't hear a thing." Al Aswad al `Ansi prepared firewood and threw him in fire. Abu Muslim said: Hasbuna'Llah wa ni`mal wakeel (Allah is sufficient for us and He is the best Protector" - the words that Muslims believe the prophet Ibrahim said when he was thrown in fire), so Allah made the fire cool and safe for him.

During the campaigns against the Byzantines
Another story is mentioned concerning Abu Muslim, which has been cited by contemporary scholars of Muslim-Christian relations during the early years of the Islamic expansion:

"We [the Muslim troops] came from the land of the Byzantines returning [from battle]; when we had left Homs going towards Damascus we passed by a cultivated place which is near Homs—about four miles—at the end of the night. When the monk who was in the cell heard our speech, he came up to us and said: 'Who are you all?' We said: 'People from Damascus, coming from the land of the Byzantines.' He said: 'Do you know Abu Muslim al-Khawlani?' We said: 'Yes.' He said: 'When you come to him, greet him with the peace, and inform him that we find him in the Holy Books as a companion of Jesus son of Mary'." 

It appears that the Christian monk sees a spiritual kinship with the Muslim, Abu Muslim al-Khawlani, and even outright says that in the messianic future when Jesus returns that there will be a unity.  Abu Muslim al-Khawlani died during the reign of Muawiya II in an expedition against the Byzantines. His last requests presented to his commander were as follows: 

"Put me in charge of the Muslims who died fighting with you, and tie for me a banner of military command over them, and make my grave the furthest of all graves [and the nearest] to the enemy, since I wish to arrive on Resurrection Day carrying their banner."

Notes

See also
Taba'een

Tabi‘un
Year of birth unknown
684 deaths
7th-century Arabs
Tabi‘un hadith narrators